Archibald Campbell (April 27, 1845 – January 5, 1913) was a Canadian politician.

Born in Howard Township, Kent County, Canada West.  His father was from Argyleshire, Scotland, and his mother a native of Oneida County, New York. Campbell was educated at the Public and High Schools of Kent. A miller, he was for several years member of the Council of Chatham which he represented in the County Council.

He was first elected to the House of Commons of Canada for the electoral district of Kent in the 1887 general elections. A Liberal, he was unseated but re-elected in a May 1888 by-election and elected again in the general elections of 1891 and 1896.

Shortly thereafter he relocated to Toronto Junction, where he owned a milling company.  As one of the town's major employers, Campbell was instrumental in getting the town a customs house so that local businesses (including his own) could clear their railway imports without having to go to downtown Toronto.  Despite this credential, he was an unsuccessful candidate in the electoral district of York West in the general elections of 1900, but he was elected in a 1902 by-election upon the death of Nathaniel Clarke Wallace. He was elected in 1904 for York Centre.

In 1907, he was called to the Senate of Canada representing the senatorial division of Toronto West, Ontario on the advice of Wilfrid Laurier. He served until his death in 1913.

References
 
 The Canadian Parliament; biographical sketches and photo-engravures of the senators and members of the House of Commons of Canada. Being the tenth Parliament, elected November 3, 1904

Notes

1845 births
1913 deaths
Canadian senators from Ontario
Liberal Party of Canada MPs
Liberal Party of Canada senators
Members of the House of Commons of Canada from Ontario